This is the Recorded Music NZ list of number-one albums in New Zealand during the 1970s decade. In May 1975 the Pop-O-Meter singles chart was replaced with the new Record Publications chart, a division of the New Zealand Phonographic Federation. As well as a new singles chart, a weekly album chart was compiled for the first time. The new top 40 album chart was launched in May 1975 by the New Zealand Phonographic Federation, and eventually expanded to a top 50 in 1979. The chart was collated by returns sent in by a representative sample of New Zealand music retailers. ABBA's 1975 compilation album The Best of ABBA charted at number one for a total of 18 weeks. Only two albums by New Zealand artists reached number one: folk-pop duo Bill and Boyd's self-titled album, and the New Zealand Symphony Orchestra's album The World's Great Classics.

The following albums were all number one in New Zealand in the 1970s.

Number ones

Key
 – Number-one album of the year
 – Album of New Zealand origin
 – Number-one album of the year, of New Zealand origin

Notes 

This album is of New Zealand origin

References 
 Album Top 40 - Charts.org.nz

External links 
 The Official NZ Music Charts

1970s
New Zealand Albums
1970s in New Zealand music